Michael Quinn is an American Democratic Party politician currently serving as a member of the Connecticut House of Representatives from the 82nd district, which includes the town of Middlefield, as well as part of Meriden, since 2021. Quinn was first elected to the seat in 2020 over Republican Mike Skelps. Quinn currently serves on the House Judiciary Committee, Public Safety and Security Committee, and the Executive and Legislative Nominations Committee. Quinn is also a fire photographer in his spare time.

References

External links

Living people
People from Meriden, Connecticut
Democratic Party members of the Connecticut House of Representatives
21st-century American politicians
American International College alumni
Year of birth missing (living people)